Kelly is a 1981 Canadian made family adventure drama directed by Christopher Chapman and written by and starring Robert Logan. Twyla Dawn Vokins plays the title character Kelly. In the 1980s the film had much play on cable tv(HBO) and was of the heartwarming type of product usually found on the commercial ABC Afterschool Special.

Story
Kelly, a preteen girl, lives in the United States(?New Jersey) with her divorced mother and stepfather. She is somewhat errant, skips school, and doesn't have too good a relationship with her mother Susan. Susan, fed up and seeking a solution to Kelly's behavior decides to pack Kelly off to her biological father, Dave, who is a bush pilot in Alaska. When Kelly arrives in Alaska she exhibits some of the same behavior she had with her mother but slowly over time becomes ingratiated with her wilderness surroundings and neighbors. Dave's assistant, an old Inuit called Clut, teaches Kelly a few things about life amongst the local townspeople.

Cast
Robert Logan - Dave
Twyla Dawn Vokins - Kelly
George Clutesi - Clut
Elaine Nalee - Susan
Doug Lennox - Beechum
Alec Willows - Brother Robin
Dan Granirer - Jimbo
Jack Leaf - Ephram
Mona Cozart - Mabel
Paddy White - Timothy
Bob Collins - Tom
Paul Coeur - Big Mac (*Paul Lolicoeur)
Robert Windsor - Brother William
Larry Koopman - Brother Thomas
Sock Seki - Brother Peter

References

External links
Kelly at IMDb.com

1981 films
English-language Canadian films
Films set in Alaska
Films shot in Calgary
1981 drama films
Canadian drama films
1980s English-language films
1980s Canadian films